Portuguese National Liberation Front (in Portuguese: Frente Portuguesa de Libertação Nacional) was a Portuguese political movement, founded in Rome in 1964 by General Humberto Delgado, following a split from the Patriotic National Liberation Front (with the same acronym - FPLN), founded two years earlier in December 1962, and based in Algiers. The short-lived Portuguese National Liberation Front was led by Delgado until his assassination in Spain by the Portuguese political police PIDE in 1965.

Defunct political parties in Portugal